{{Speciesbox
| image = Quercus acutifolia 02.jpg
| status_system = IUCN3.1
| status = VU
| status_ref = 
| genus = Quercus
| display_parents = 2
| parent = Quercus sect. Lobatae
| species = acutifolia
| authority = Née
| synonyms_ref = 
| synonyms = {{collapsible list|bullets = true
  |Quercus acutifolia f. abrupta Trel.
  |Quercus acutifolia var. angustifolia A.DC., not validly publ.
  |Quercus acutifolia var. bonplandii A.DC. 
  |Quercus acutifolia var. conspersa (Benth.) A.DC.
  |Quercus acutifolia var. microcarpa A.DC.
  |Quercus anglohondurensis C.H.Mull.
  |Quercus candolleana Trel. 
  |Quercus conspersa Benth. 
  |Quercus conspersa f. caudata Trel.
  |Quercus conspersa f. ovatifolia Trel.
  |Quercus correpta Trel.
  |Quercus grahamii var. coyulana Trel.
  |Quercus grahamii var. nelsonii Trel.
  |Quercus monserratensis C.H.Mull.
  |Quercus nitida M.Martens & Galeotti
  |Quercus sartorii Botteri ex A.DC.
  |Quercus tenuiaristata Trel.
  |Quercus tonaguiae Trel.
  |Quercus uruapanensis Trel.
  }}
}}Quercus acutifolia, many synonyms including Quercus conspersa'', is a species of oak tree. It is native to central and southern Mexico and northern Central America, from Nayarit south as far as Belize and Guatemala.

It is placed in Quercus section Lobatae.

The leaves are stiff and leathery, rigid, narrowly elliptical, up to 16 cm long, dark green on the top and lighter green underneath, with 8–14 bristly teeth on each side. It retains its leaves until winter and can withstand about  -10 °C.

References

acutifolia
Flora of Central America
Oaks of Mexico
Trees of Guerrero
Trees of Oaxaca
Trees of Puebla
Plants described in 1801
Flora of the Sierra Madre Occidental
Flora of the Sierra Madre Oriental
Flora of the Sierra Madre de Oaxaca
Flora of the Sierra Madre del Sur
Flora of the Chiapas Highlands
Sierra Madre de Chiapas